Rajendra Waman Najardhane is a member of the 13th Maharashtra Legislative Assembly. He represents the Umarkhed Assembly Constituency. He belongs to the Bharatiya Janata Party (BJP). He had unsuccessfully contested the 2009  Maharashtra Legislative Assembly elections on the BJP ticket but lost to Vijay Khadse of the Indian National Congress. His victory was amongst the five seats won by the BJP, that resulted in the Indian National Congress (INC) not being able to win a single seat in Yavatmal district once its stronghold.

References

Maharashtra MLAs 2014–2019
Bharatiya Janata Party politicians from Maharashtra
Living people
People from Yavatmal district
Marathi politicians
Year of birth missing (living people)